Max Currie is a New Zealand film director and screenwriter, most noted for his 2020 film Rūrangi.

Biography 

Currie grew up in Palmerston North, and is the son of a microbiologist and a kindergarten teacher. Currie moved to Auckland for university, and later spent a year in Germany, working as a chef in an Australian-themed restaurant. He moved to New York City as the spouse of a diplomat, and worked as a bartender at a gay bar on the Lower East Side.

Currie was formerly a reporter and presenter for the documentary television series Queer Nation, and a writer for the soap opera Shortland Street. His debut film Everything We Loved was released in 2014, garnering him nominations for Best Director and Best Screenplay at the 2014 Rialto Channel New Zealand Film Awards.

Rūrangi began as a web series before being edited into a feature film. The film premiered at the New Zealand International Film Festival in 2020, and won the award for Best Feature at the 2020 Frameline Film Festival.

In 2021, Currie appeared as a member of the Pit Crew in the first season of RuPaul's Drag Race Down Under.

Personal life 

Currie identifies as gay.

References

External links

21st-century New Zealand male writers
New Zealand screenwriters
New Zealand television writers
New Zealand film directors
New Zealand gay writers
New Zealand LGBT screenwriters
LGBT film directors
Living people
Year of birth missing (living people)